Daigo may refer to:

Buddhism
Daigo (Zen) (大悟), a Buddhist term meaning great enlightenment or great realization
Daigo (Shōbōgenzō) (大悟), or Great Realization, a book in Eihei Dōgen's Shōbōgenzō
Daigo Temple (醍醐寺), from which Emperor Daigo took his name

People
Emperor Daigo (醍醐天皇), Emperor of Japan between 897 and 930
Daigo family, a branch of the Ichijō family of Japanese nobility
Daigo (musician) (born 1978), Japanese singer-songwriter, actor, talent, and voice actor
Daigo (name)
Daigo Umehara, or simply "Daigo", Japanese competitive fighting game player

Places
Daigo, Fushimi, Kyoto, a district in the ward of Fushimi-ku, Kyoto
Daigo Station (Kyoto) (醍醐駅), a train station
Daigo Station (Akita) (醍醐駅), a train station
Daigo, Ibaraki (大子町), a town in Ibaraki Prefecture

Other uses
Daigo (dairy product) (醍醐), or ghee, which is theorized to have been made in ancient Japan
, aka  from Gosei Sentai Dairanger

See also
Daigou (代购), the unauthorized import of foreign goods into China